William McIlroy (24 November 1883 – 18 August 1960) was an Australian rules footballer who played with University in the Victorian Football League (VFL).

McIlroy’s first senior level football appearance was in 1908 when he joined the Essendon Association team from the Public Service team. Five years later he obtained a clearance to University at the start of the 1913 VFL season and he made three VFL appearances.

A career public servant, McIlroy was appointed Secretary of Lands in 1933 and served in this role until his retirement in 1949.

References

External links 
 
 

1883 births
1960 deaths
Australian rules footballers from Ballarat
University Football Club players
Essendon Association Football Club players